Muehlenbeckia adpressa, commonly known as climbing lignum, is a prostrate or climbing plant, native to Australia. It occurs in coastal areas of Western Australia, South Australia, Tasmania, Victoria and New South Wales.

Taxonomy
The species was first described in 1805 by Jacques Labillardière, as Polygonum adpressum. It was transferred to the genus Muehlenbeckia in 1843 by Carl Meissner. Some sources, including Plants of the World Online, regard M. adpressa as a synonym of M. australis. Others treat them as separate species.

Gallery

References

External links
Muehlenbeckia adpressa occurrence data from Australasian Virtual Herbarium

adpressa
Caryophyllales of Australia
Flora of New South Wales
Flora of South Australia
Flora of Tasmania
Flora of Victoria (Australia)
Eudicots of Western Australia
Plants described in 1805
Taxa named by Carl Meissner